"One of Those Things" is a song written by American country music artists Pam Tillis and Paul Overstreet and recorded by Tillis on Warner Bros. Records. The song was released as a single in June 1985, but did not chart. After signing with Arista Nashville in 1989, Tillis re-recorded the song and released it as the second single from her 1990 studio album Put Yourself in My Place in April 1991. This version reached number six on the Billboard Hot Country Singles & Tracks chart.

Chart performance

Year-end charts

References

1985 singles
1991 singles
Pam Tillis songs
Songs written by Paul Overstreet
Song recordings produced by Paul Worley
Warner Records singles
Arista Nashville singles
Songs written by Pam Tillis